National Youth Day is a holiday dedicated to the youths of a country. It is observed by 18 countries, on many dates throughout the year. The United Nations agreed on the date of 12 August in 1999 in South Africa.

National Youth Day
International Youth Day is an international observance on August 12 officially recognized by the United Nations.The UN General Assembly agreed on this date in 1999.

Country wide list

Angola
On April 14, Angola observes Youth Day in memory of Hoji-ya-Henda, who was killed on that day during the Portuguese Colonial War.

Cameroon
National Youth Day is a national holiday in Cameroon on February 11.

Greater China

Taiwan
Youth Day (青年節) in the Republic of China has been celebrated on June 16 since 1954. It commemorates the Huanghuagang Uprising of 1911, during which 72 young revolutionaries sacrificed their lives to overthrow the Qing Dynasty. The Uprising took place on April 27 (the 29th day of the 3rd month in Chinese Calendar), 1911 and is subsequently known as 3.29 Guangzhou Uprising. This event also marked the last unsuccessful attempt to overthrow the Qing before the Wuchang Uprising overturned millennia of dynastic rule in China to establish the Republic of China.

Mainland China

In the People's Republic of China, Youth Day (青年节) celebrated on May 4.  It was established in December 1949 by the Government Administration Council to commemorate the patriotic May Fourth Movement in 1919, in which many young intellectuals protested against imperialists.

India

Youth Day in India is celebrated on 12 January on the birthday of Swami Vivekananda.

In 1984, the Government of India declared and decided to observe the Birthday of Swami Vivekananda (12 January, according to the English calendar) as National Youth Day every year from 1985 onwards. To quote from the Government of India's Communication, ‘It was felt that the philosophy of Swamiji and the ideals for which he lived and worked could be a great source of inspiration for the Indian Youth.’

Swami Vivekananda's Birthday, according to Indian Almanac (Vishuddha Siddhanta Almanac) is on Pausha Krishna Saptami tithi, which falls on different English Calendar dates every year. This is observed in various centres of Ramakrishna Math and Mission in a traditional Hindu manner which includes mangalarati, special worship, homa (fire-ritual), meditation, devotional songs, religious discourses, sandhyarati (versper service in the evenings), and so on.

The National Youth Day is observed all over India at schools and colleges with processions, speeches, recitations, music, youth conventions, seminars, Yogasana presentation, competitions in essay-writing, recitations, speeches, music, sports, and other programs on 12 January every year dunce.

Iran
Youth Day is celebrated in Iran on 11th Shaban (Hijri Ghamari) on the birthday of Hazrat e Alie Akbar (first son of Imam Hossein).
After Iran revolution in 1979 the Muslim government endeavored to replace most of the national days with religious events.

Kiribati
Youth Day is celebrated on the first Friday of August in Kiribati.

Morocco
Youth Day is a public holiday in Morocco on August 21, the birthday of the reigning monarch, Mohammed VI of Morocco.

Nigeria
President Muhammadu Buhari established National Youth Day in 2020 to find solutions to the issues that affect young people. It is held on November 1.

Pakistan
Youth Day is celebrated on March 11 in Pakistan.

Paraguay
Youth and Spring Day (Día de la Primavera y la Juventud) is celebrated on September 21 in Paraguay, which marks the start of the spring season.

Singapore
Youth Day is celebrated on first Sunday of July every year in Singapore.
The next day will normally be a scheduled school holiday. (Original date: 4 July)

South Africa

Youth Day on 16 June is a public holiday in South Africa and commemorates a protest which resulted in a wave of protests across the country known as the Soweto uprising of 1976. It came in response to multiple issues with the Bantu Education Act and the government edict in 1974 that Afrikaans will be used as medium of instruction for certain subjects in black schools. The iconic picture of Hector Pieterson whose sister now works at a museum which honours Hector Peterson and his family claim that the apartheid regime spelled his name wrong, a black schoolchild shot by the police, brought home to many people within and outside of South Africa the effect of the struggle during the Apartheid government's reign. It is celebrated as a public holiday across South Africa to remember the brave students who protest against Afrikaans as the only medium of language for education.

Thailand
On 20 September each year in Thailand, National Youth Day (Wan Yaowachon Haeng Chat) commemorates the birth dates of Kings Chulalongkorn and Ananda Mahidol.
Thailand celebrates Youth Day on this date because of the many births in the month of September.

Turkey

Youth and Sports Day (Gençlik ve Spor Bayramı) on May 19 in Turkey is dedicated to the youth.  This day is also Atatürk Day (Atatürk'ü Anma), a day of commemoration of Kemal Atatürk, the "Father of Turkey", and the commemoration of the beginning of the national liberation movement initiated by Atatürk in 1919

The day is celebrated in honor of the arrival of Kemal Atatürk to Samsun on May 19, 1919, when the Turkish War of Independence began.

Tunisia
Youth Day is celebrated on March 21 in Tunisia just after celebration of their independence.

Ukraine
Youth Day is celebrated in Ukraine on August 12. Before 2022 it was celebrated on the last Sunday of June. The date was moved in 2021 "in order to support the desire of Ukrainian youth to integrate into the European community, affirm the values of democracy and freedom, as well as taking into account the initiative of youth organizations and movements." August 12 is the day International Youth Day is observed.

Venezuela
Youth Day is celebrated on February 12. The holiday was created to commemorate all the teenagers above 12 years old who fought and died in the Battle of La Victoria (1812), during the Venezuelan War of Independence, on February 12, 1814.

Yugoslavia

Youth Day was celebrated throughout the former Yugoslavia on May 25. This was also a celebration of Josip Broz Tito's birthday. Even though Tito was born on May 7, 1892, this date was chosen in remembrance of the Operation Rösselsprung in 1944, a Nazi attempt on his life on the date of birth listed on his forged personal documents. In the weeks preceding the festival, youth ran a relay around the country, and on his birthday Tito was ceremonially presented with the baton. The baton, which had passed through all major cities, contained a symbolic birthday message, ostensibly from the youth of the whole country.  

After the breakup of Yugoslavia, Youth Day continues to be celebrated in Tito's birthplace of Kumrovec, gathering several thousand visitors annually.

Zambia

Youth Day is celebrated on March 12.

Youth Day recalls the day in 1962 when young people were killed during the independence movement. The day celebrates young people and their contribution to development. It recognizes that the young people are the future leaders and must be treated as such.

Zimbabwe
Robert Gabriel Mugabe National Youth Day is February 21.

See also
World Youth Day – observed by the Roman Catholic Church

References

External links
National Youth Day : India
Youthwork Dates
 – 

Types of secular holidays
Youth culture
Civil awareness days
January observances
February observances
March observances
April observances
May observances
June observances
July observances
August observances
September observances
December observances
Holidays and observances by scheduling (nth weekday of the month)